Jackson Township is one of the fifteen townships of Putnam County, Ohio, United States.  The 2000 census found 939 people in the township.

Geography
Located in the western part of the county, it borders the following townships:
Perry Township - north
Greensburg Township - northeast corner
Union Township - east
Sugar Creek Township - southeast corner
Jennings Township - south
Monterey Township - southwest
Washington Township, Paulding County - northwest

No municipalities are located in Jackson Township.

Name and history
Jackson Township was organized in the 1830s, but the exact date is unknown since records were lost. It is one of thirty-seven Jackson Townships statewide.

Government
The township is governed by a three-member board of trustees, who are elected in November of odd-numbered years to a four-year term beginning on the following January 1. Two are elected in the year after the presidential election and one is elected in the year before it. There is also an elected township fiscal officer, who serves a four-year term beginning on April 1 of the year after the election, which is held in November of the year before the presidential election. Vacancies in the fiscal officership or on the board of trustees are filled by the remaining trustees.

References

External links
County website

Townships in Putnam County, Ohio
Townships in Ohio